Lu is a Chinese surname. It is also spelled Luk according to the Cantonese pronunciation. Lu 逯 is listed 404th in the Song Dynasty classic text Hundred Family Surnames. Relatively uncommon, Lu 逯 is the 356th most common surname in China, being shared by 121,000 people, with the province with the greatest number of people being Shandong.

Origins
According to the second-century Eastern Han Dynasty text Fengsu Tongyi, Lu 逯 was a place name in the State of Qin of the Eastern Zhou dynasty, in modern Shaanxi province. An official of Qin was enfeoffed at Lu, and his descendants adopted Lu as their surname.

According to the Song Dynasty text Lushi, another origin of the Lu 逯 surname is the State of Chu, also of the Eastern Zhou dynasty. A kinsman of the king of Chu was enfeoffed at the settlement of Lu, and his descendants adopted Lu as their surname. This lineage of Lu is a branch of the Chu royal surname Mi.

Notable people
Lu Pu (逯普), Han dynasty nobleman, Marquis of Mengxiang
Lu Bing (逯并), Xin dynasty marshall
Lu Luzeng (逯鲁曾, died 1352), high-ranking Yuan Dynasty government official
Lu Qinli (逯钦立, 1911–1973), paleographer
Lu Yaodong (逯耀東, 1933–2006), historian and professor of National Taiwan University
Max Lu or Lu Gaoqing (逯高清; born 1963), nanotechnologist, Vice-Chancellor of the University of Surrey
Lu Jiajing (逯佳境; born 1989), tennis player
Lu Jiaxiang (逯佳翔; born 1989), tennis player, twin sister of Lu Jiajing

References

Chinese-language surnames
Individual Chinese surnames